Max Edmund Palmer (November 27, 1927May 7, 1984) was an American actor and professional wrestler. Known for his great height, in 2014 he was described as the second tallest professional wrestler in history.

Career
After high school Palmer left Mississippi to play with the professional basketball team Rochester Royals. After basketball Palmer went back to Mississippi only to work odd jobs working his way to Hollywood to get into acting. Palmer was discovered by an ex-Chicago newspaper man named Fritz Blocki. Palmer's first appearance on film was on the Dean Martin/Jerry Lewis Comedy Hour. Palmer's acting career spanned from 1952 to 1954. He starred in such movies as Invaders from Mars and Killer Ape with Johnny Weissmuller. He also guested variety shows such as Dean Martin/Jerry Lewis Comedy Hour, The Spade Cooley Show, and The Jimmy Durante Show.

 After he left acting, Palmer became a professional wrestler in Salt Lake City, Utah. He was billed as "Paul Bunyan".  He became an evangelist in 1963. He preached all over the United States, calling himself "Goliath for Christ". He preached until his death in 1984 from heart disease.

Personal life
Palmer was born in Pontotoc, Mississippi. In May 1975, Palmer married a woman, Betty, and they remained married until his death. When measured for his coffin, he measured  and needed a  coffin. Palmer is buried in Randolph, Mississippi, near Pontotoc, Mississippi at Carey Springs Baptist Church.

Filmography

References

1930 U.S. Federal Census, Beat 4, Quitman County, Mississippi
1940 U.S. Federal Census, Beat 4, Quitman County, Mississippi

External links
The Tallest Man: Max Palmer
Max Palmer at Find a Grave

1927 births
1984 deaths
People from Pontotoc, Mississippi
American male professional wrestlers
People from Arnold, Missouri
Professional wrestlers from Mississippi
20th-century American male actors